Tenement Steps was the third and final studio album by English rock band The Motors, originally released in early 1980. The album reached number 174 in the Billboard 200. Four singles came from the album, "Love and Loneliness", "That's What John Said", "Tenement Steps" and "Metropolis". "Love and Loneliness" reached No. 58 in the UK Singles Chart and No. 78 in the Billboard Hot 100. The other singles did not chart.

After Ricky Slaughter and Bram Tchaikovsky had both left The Motors in 1978, they effectively became a 2-piece group with Nick Garvey and Andy McMaster. They used session musicians for the album: Martin Ace on bass, and on drums, Michael Desmarais on "Here Comes The Hustler" and Terry Williams on the rest of the album.

The top left and bottom right corners of the front album were die-cut by Virgin Records on the original release. The red inner sleeve was also cut to match outer sleeve.

Track listing

Personnel
The Motors
Nick Garvey - vocals, guitar, bass on "Tenement Steps" and "Here Comes the Hustler", piano on "Love and Loneliness"
Andy McMaster - vocals, keyboards
Martin Ace - bass
Terry Williams - drums
with:
Michael Desmarais - drums on "Here Comes the Hustler"

References

1980 albums
Virgin Records albums
The Motors albums
Albums produced by Jimmy Iovine